The Riverland Biosphere Reserve, formerly the Bookmark Biosphere Reserve, is a  area of land in eastern South Australia, adjoining the states of New South Wales and Victoria.  It is one of 14 biosphere reserves in Australia and is part of the World Network of Biosphere Reserves, being officially recognized and listed by UNESCO in 1977.

Description
The reserve is composed of several mainly contiguous properties that, although having different ownerships and different management purposes, have the joint aim of identifying approaches to ecologically sustainable development in a low-productivity landscape with many shared land-management problems.  It lies in the Murray Mallee and the Riverland with the native vegetation predominantly mallee woodland and shrubland, but also including wetlands and riverine communities along the Murray River.  The flood plains of the reserve are recognised as internationally significant wetlands for migratory birds under the Ramsar Convention.  The reserve is involved in Australia's national recovery plan for the endangered black-eared miner.

The reserve's many component properties include protected areas, pastoral leases and privately owned land such as the following:
 Calperum Station
 Chowilla Regional Reserve
 Chowilla Game Reserve
 Cooltong Conservation Park
 Danggali Conservation Park
 Danggali Wilderness Protection Area
 Gluepot Reserve
 Loch Luna Game Reserve
 Moorook Game Reserve
 Murray River National Park
 Taylorville Station

The reserve is also overlapped by the Riverland Mallee Important Bird Area, an area identified by BirdLife International as being "important" for the conservation of mallee birds and their habitats.

See also
 List of biosphere reserves in Australia

References

External links
 UNESCO - Biosphere reserves
 Australian biosphere reserves - location map
Entry for Riverland Biosphere Reserve on protected planet

Biosphere reserves of Australia
Riverland
Murray River
1977 establishments in Australia